Harrison Michael Ford (born February 21, 2003) is an American baseball catcher in the Seattle Mariners organization. He was selected in the first round of the 2021 Major League Baseball draft by the Mariners. He represents Great Britain at the international level.

Amateur career
Ford attended North Cobb High School in Kennesaw, Georgia. Ford committed to play college baseball at Georgia Tech. As a senior, he batted .296 with seven doubles and five home runs and was named the Greater Atlanta Player of the Year. Ford played in 104 games over four varsity seasons and batted for a .343 average with 83 runs scored, 20 doubles, seven triples, seven home runs, and 57 RBIs.

Professional career
The Seattle Mariners selected Ford in the first round, with the 12th overall pick, in the 2021 Major League Baseball draft.
On July 22, 2021, Ford signed with the Mariners for the assigned slot value of $4.36 million.

Ford made his professional debut with the Rookie-level Arizona Complex League Mariners, slashing .291/.400/.482 with three home runs, ten RBIs, seven doubles, nine walks and 14 strikeouts over 55 at-bats. He opened the 2022 season with the Modesto Nuts of the Single-A California League.

International career
Ford was selected to represent Great Britain at the 2023 World Baseball Classic qualification. He is eligible for play as both his parents were born in Great Britain.

References

External links

Baseball players from Georgia (U.S. state)
Baseball catchers
Living people
2003 births
Arizona Complex League Mariners players
Modesto Nuts players
American people of British descent
Great Britain national baseball team players
2023 World Baseball Classic players